Soldier Cap Mound is a summit in Saline County, Kansas, in the United States.

Soldier Cap Mound was named from its resemblance to a soldier's headdress.

References

Landforms of Saline County, Kansas